Glossogobius intermedius is a species of goby endemic to Sulawesi, Indonesia where it is only known to occur in Lake Towuti and Lake Mahalona.  This species can reach a length of  SL.

References

intermedius
Freshwater fish of Sulawesi
Taxonomy articles created by Polbot
Fish described in 1938